Ammie Thomas Sikes (July 26, 1892 – September 9, 1963) was an American college football player and physician. He played as a fullback at Vanderbilt University from 1911 to 1914.

Early years
Sikes was born on July 26, 1892, in Smyrna, Tennessee, to Jessie Sikes and Jennie James.

Vanderbilt University

Football
Sikes was a prominent fullback for Dan McGugin's Vanderbilt Commodores of Vanderbilt University from 1911 to 1914. He was thrice selected All-Southern.

1911
The 1911 Southern Intercollegiate Athletic Association (SIAA) championship team outscored opponents 259 to 9, suffering its only loss by a single point to Michigan. Edwin Pope's Football's Greatest Coaches reads "A lightning-swift backfield of Lew Hardage, Wilson Collins, Ammie Sikes, and Ray Morrison pushed Vandy through 1911 with only a 9-8 loss to Michigan." The Atlanta Constitution voted it the best backfield in the South.

1912
The 1912 team lost only to national champion Harvard and outscored opponents 393 to 19. The Commodores scored 100 points in both of its first two games.

1913

In 1913, Sikes took Lewie Hardage's old position at left halfback. On the 7 to 6 win over Tennessee in 1913, one account reads "'Red' Rainey shone for Tennessee, though he was later relegated to the side lines after a collision with one A. Sikes, Esq., otherwise known as the "Roaring Representative from Williamson."

1914
Sikes was captain of the 1914 team. He made Outings Roll of Honor.

Coaching career
Sikes coached Montgomery Bell Academy in 1916 and to the state prep championship in 1917.

Medical career and death
Sikes earned a Doctor of Medicine degree from Vanderbilt University School of Medicine in 1918 and served in the Medical Corps during World War I. He completed his internship and residency after the war at Bellevue Hospital in New York City. After a year with the Public Health Institute of Chicago, Sikes returned in 1922 to Nashville, where he practiced as a specialist in internal medicine. He died on September 9, 1963, at his Royal Oaks Apartments home in Nashville.

References

1892 births
1963 deaths
20th-century American physicians
American football fullbacks
American football punters
American internists
Vanderbilt Commodores football players
High school football coaches in Tennessee
All-Southern college football players
Vanderbilt University School of Medicine alumni
People from Smyrna, Tennessee
Coaches of American football from Tennessee
Players of American football from Tennessee
Physicians from Tennessee